Advanced Digital Corporation (ADC) was a privately owned American computer company based in California, active from the 1980s to the 1990s. The company was founded by 1980 by a group of engineers, in order to market their single-user and multi-user expansion cards and peripherals for S-100–based computers.

In 1983, ADC introduced a pair of their own S-100 computers, the Super Six and the Super Star. In 1984, they made the pivot to production of expansion cards for the IBM Personal Computer, with one (the PC II, co-produced by Link Technologies of Fremont) allowing the IBM PC to be used as a multi-user platform, with as many as 32 concurrent users. Toward the late 1980s, they introduced their own 386SX-based PC compatible systems under the PowerLite name, to critical acclaim in the tech press. ADC was initially based in Garden Grove, California, employing 35 by mid-1983. In late 1983, they moved to Huntington Beach. By April 1984, their employee headcount reached 75. Its president was Hossein Asadi (born 1961, also known as Hossein Asadibagheri). The company entered bankruptcy in 1990.

Their Huntington Beach headquarters were the subject of an armed robbery in September 1988, with Asadi being bound and gagged while various merchandise was stolen. Asadi sustained no physical injuries.

References

External links
 Advanced Digital Corporation history at S100Computers.com

American companies established in 1980
American companies disestablished in 1990
Computer companies established in 1980
Computer companies disestablished in 1990
Defunct companies based in Greater Los Angeles
Defunct computer companies based in California
Defunct computer companies of the United States
Defunct computer hardware companies